"Speak Now" is a song written and recorded by American singer-songwriter Taylor Swift. It is the title track for her third studio album, album of the same name (2010), and was released for digital download as a promotional single on October 5, 2010, by Big Machine Records. Produced by Swift and Nathan Chapman, "Speak Now" is an acoustic guitar-driven country pop song with its refrain incorporating the 1950s rock chord progression. Lyrically, the track is about a protagonist interrupting a wedding in an attempt to win her ex-lover back. Swift was inspired to write it after learning that an ex-boyfriend of her friend would marry someone else.

Music critics lauded the narrative lyrics and production of "Speak Now"; some picked it as an album highlight. The song peaked at number eight on both the Canadian Hot 100 and the US Billboard Hot 100, marking Swift's sixth top-ten debut on the latter and making her the first artist with six US top-ten debuts. It also charted on the Hot Country Songs chart and was certified gold by the Recording Industry Association of America (RIAA) for 500,000 US digital sales. "Speak Now" additionally reached number 20 in Australia and number 34 in New Zealand.

Background and release
American singer-songwriter Taylor Swift wrote all tracks on her third album, Speak Now (2010), by herself. The title track was inspired by a story of a friend of hers. This friend parted ways with her high-school boyfriend with hopes that they would rekindle in the future, but one day the friend learnt that the boyfriend would soon wed another woman. Swift recalled, "He had met this girl who's just this horrible, mean person who made him completely stop talking to all of his friends, cut off his family. She had him so completely isolated." Swift asked her friend if she would interrupt the wedding and "speak now", drawing on the saying, "Speak now or forever hold your peace."

After speaking with her friend, Swift became fixated on the idea of how tragic it would be for the person one loved to wed someone else. That night, Swift experienced a dream where one of her own ex-boyfriends married another girl. To her, this signaled that she had to compose a song about interrupting a wedding. In retrospect, she concluded, "For me, I like to think of it as good versus evil. And this girl is just completely – just the evil one." Swift entitled the album after "Speak Now" because it fit the album's concept, with each song being a different confession to a person. She explained that "Speak Now" served as a metaphor for her decision to express her thoughts or stay quiet forever, "[That] moment where it's almost too late, and you've got to either say what it is you are feeling or deal with the consequences forever."

The song was released as a promotional single on October 5, 2010, by Big Machine Records as part of "Countdown to Speak Now", an exclusive campaign launched by the iTunes Store. During the opening week of Speak Now, Swift performed the title track on the Late Show with David Letterman.

Composition
"Speak Now" is a country pop track with a length of four minutes and two seconds. It has a predominant pop music composition, intertwined with various country elements. The song is set in common time and has a moderate tempo of 120 beats per minute. It is written in the key of G major and Swift's vocals span two octaves, from A3 to D5. Swift's vocals begin in a hushed tone, then gradually grow until, at one point, she belts out the song's title. The song features different twangy, up-and-down vocal hooks might, in similarity to "You Belong with Me". It follows the chord progression G–D–Am–C. The track is driven by acoustic guitar and features a guitar solo in the break. The refrain incorporates the '50s rock progression.

In the lyrics of "Speak Now", the narrator crashes her former love's wedding in attempt to win him back because she thinks he is marrying an unsuitable woman. The opening lines acknowledge that, although out of character, Swift is still in love with her ex-boyfriend and wants to make sure he does not marry the wrong girl. Throughout the song's verses, Swift sneaks in the wedding and describes her observations, such as the bride-to-be's wearing of a poofy wedding gown shaped like a pastry, her cumulative family, and an organist playing "Bridal Chorus". In the refrain, Swift pleads her ex-boyfriend to not say his wedding vows in order to run away with her. The bridge has Swift responding to the priest's calling of "Speak now or forever hold your peace" before repeating the opening lines. The last refrain is altered, with Swift narrating from the groom's perspective and inform Swift they will indeed run away together. Some critics compared the storyline of "Speak Now" to that of Swift's 2009 single "You Belong with Me"; both protagonists yearn for a love interest who is in love with another woman.

Live performances

The song was performed as part of the regular setlist on the Speak Now World Tour (2011–12). Clips of the performance can be seen in the music video for Swift's single "Sparks Fly". According to Jocelyn Vena of MTV.com, the performance was "a very theatrical moment" in which "Swift acted out crashing a wedding. She eventually stole the groom away, as she sings in the song, and the pair ran through the crowd together." Swift performed the song on September 22, 2018, as the acoustic surprise song at the New Orleans stop on the Reputation Stadium Tour.

Critical reception
Simon Vozick-Levinson of Entertainment Weekly deemed "Speak Now" a catchy song and opined that Swift's lyrical delivery makes up for her shortcomings as a vocalist. Jon Caramanica from The New York Times lauded the production, saying that it proved Chapman to be "a first-rate producer, and not just of the pop-country that's made Ms. Swift one of the most important new musicians of the decade". Writing for the Hartford Courant, Erin R. Danton commended the melody as "irresistible". Ken Tucker, in a radio episode for NPR, commended the track for appealing to casual listeners for its "meticulously detailed" production. In The Morning Call, John J. Moser thought "Speak Now" was one of the album's most interesting songs because it features "a jaunty lilt, '50s-rock chorus and over-the-top snotty lyrics that are interesting precisely because they’re new for Swift". On a less positive side, Jonathan Keefe of Slant Magazine thought that "Speak Now", with its theme about love and romance, proved Swift's lack of songwriting material other than "how great boys are or how much boys suck or how dreams about boys will take her somewhere better than where she is now". In a retrospective review for Billboard, Jason Lipshutz highlighted the track's delicate lyrical details. Nate Jones from Vulture described the narrative as "nonsense" but praised the production, especially the "admittedly charming chorus", and remarked: "it's hard not to smile at the unabashed silliness."

Commercial performance
"Speak Now" entered the Billboard Hot 100 at number eight due to the sales of 217,000 digital downloads. With that week's appearance on the chart, "Speak Now" became Swift's sixth top ten debut and, therefore, set the mark that made Swift the artist with most top ten debuts in the history of the Billboard Hot 100, surpassing the five top ten entries earned by Mariah Carey from 1995 to 1998.  Elsewhere in North America, the track debuted at number eight on the Canadian Hot 100. In Australia, "Speak Now" debuted at number twenty.

Charts

Certification

Release history

References

2010 songs
Songs written by Taylor Swift
Taylor Swift songs
Song recordings produced by Nathan Chapman (record producer)
Big Machine Records singles
Songs about marriage
Song recordings produced by Taylor Swift
Country pop songs